Mid Bedfordshire  may refer to:

Mid Bedfordshire (district), abolished 2009
Mid Bedfordshire (UK Parliament constituency)